The 2002 Texas Longhorns football team represented the University of Texas at Austin in the 2002 NCAA Division I-A football season. The team was coached by head football coach Mack Brown and led on the field by senior quarterback Chris Simms.

Schedule

Season summary

North Texas

North Carolina

Mack Brown's first game back at North Carolina since taking the Texas job.

Houston

Tulane

Oklahoma St

Oklahoma

Kansas St

Iowa St

Nebraska

Baylor

Texas Tech

Texas A&M

Chris Simms 278 Yds, 3 TD (finished 15–0 at home as starting QB)

Cotton Bowl

Roster

References

Texas
Texas Longhorns football seasons
Cotton Bowl Classic champion seasons
Texas Longhorns football